John Bromwich and Adrian Quist, the two-time defending champions in this event, successfully defended their title by defeating Jack Crawford and Vivian McGrath 6–3, 7–5, 6–1, to win the men's doubles tennis title at the 1940 Australian Championships.

Partaking in the Doubles was the only opportunity for Len Schwartz and Lionel Brodie, the seventh and eighth players in national ranking, to play in this year's Championships, as their late entries for the Singles were not accepted by the Council of the Lawn Tennis Association of Australia.

Seeds

  John Bromwich /  Adrian Quist (champions)
  Jack Crawford /  Vivian McGrath (final)
  Harry Hopman /  Len Schwartz (semifinals)
  Colin Long /  Don Turnbull (semifinals)

Draw

References

External links
  Source for seedings and the draw

1940 in Australian tennis
Men's Doubles